Spatulate Ridge is an ice-covered ridge in the Mountaineer Range which extends southeast between Suter Glacier and Ridgeway Glacier to the coast of Victoria Land. The name is descriptive of the shape and was applied in 1966 by the New Zealand Antarctic Place-Names Committee (NZ-APC).

See also
Apostrophe Island

Ridges of Victoria Land
Borchgrevink Coast